The 1984 Arkansas Razorbacks football team represented the University of Arkansas during the 1984 NCAA Division I-A football season. Junior punt returner Bobby Edmonds of Arkansas ranked ninth in the nation in punt return average. He averaged 11.8 yards per return. Arkansas had the seventh-best scoring defense in 1984, yielding only 12.5 points per game.

Schedule

Roster
QB Brad Taylor

Liberty Bowl
The Razorbacks met current SEC foe Auburn in the Liberty Bowl. The MVP of the game was Bo Jackson of Auburn, who had 88 yards on 18 carries with 2 touchdowns. Arkansas quarterback Brad Taylor completed 18 of 34, for 201 yards passing, with one touchdown and two interceptions. The Auburn defense held the Hog's leading rusher Marshall Foreman to 62 yards on 15 carries. Arkansas lost the game 21–15, despite outgaining the Tigers in total yards, 356 to 252.

References

Arkansas
Arkansas Razorbacks football seasons
Arkansas Razorbacks football